Edmonton was a local government district in north-east Middlesex, England, from 1850 to 1965.

History
Edmonton local board was formed in 1850 for the parish of Edmonton All Saints. In 1881 Southgate was separated from the Edmonton local board's district, forming its own local board. Edmonton became an urban district in 1894 under the Local Government Act of that year. In 1937 the urban district was granted a charter of incorporation as a municipal borough.

In 1965 the municipal borough was abolished and its former area transferred to Greater London to be combined with that of the Municipal Borough of Southgate and the Municipal Borough of Enfield to form the London Borough of Enfield.

Edmonton's old town hall in Fore Street, designed in the Gothic style and completed in 1885, was demolished in the 1980s.

Coat of arms
The Municipal Borough of Edmonton was granted a coat of arms on 2 October 1937. It was as follows:

The black and blue background represents the division of the ancient parish of Edmonton, the western portion being the district of Southgate. The saltire (St Alban's Cross) refers to the Abbey of St Albans which held the Manor of Edmonton and the book alludes to the Borough's literary associations, especially with Lamb and Keats.
The lion is from the arms of the old local family of Francis, while the cinquefoil stands for the family of Charlton, sometime Lords of the Manor. The lion holds a sledgehammer symbolizing the vigour of Edmonton's industries, to which the cogwheels also refer. The flames allude in particular to the gas industry.
The supporting lions are taken to typify courage and determination. One banner alludes to the ancient forests of the neighbourhood, and the other contains the seaxes from the arms of the Middlesex County Council. The saltires repeat that on the shield.

References

External links
Vision of Britain - Enfield UD / MB

Enfield
History of the London Borough of Enfield
Municipal boroughs of England
History of local government in Middlesex
Municipal Borough of